Lincoln High School is a state co-educational secondary school located in Lincoln in Canterbury's Selwyn District in New Zealand.

Notable alumni 

 Mitchell Dunshea (born 1995), rugby union player
 Sophie Pascoe (attended 2006–2010), Paralympic swimmer and gold medallist (2008 Beijing, 2012 London)
 Rachel Smalley (attended 1983–1987), television and radio journalist and presenter
 Bill Tuiloma (born 1995), New Zealand footballer

References

External links
Education Review Office (ERO) reports

Secondary schools in Canterbury, New Zealand
Educational institutions established in 1959
1959 establishments in New Zealand